Garvey and O'Garvey are Irish surnames, derived from the Gaelic Ó Gairbhith, also spelt Ó Gairbheith, meaning "descendant of Gairbhith". Gairbhith itself means "rough peace".

There are three distinct Ó Gairbhith septs in Ireland: 
 A sept of the over-kingdom of Ulaid, who were kin of the Mac Aonghusa. They were located in present-day County Down, Northern Ireland.
 A sept of the over-kingdom of Airgíalla, who were kin of the Ó hAnluain. They at one time ruled Uí Bresail, also known as Clann Breasail (Clanbrassil), located in the present-day barony of Oneilland East in County Armagh, Northern Ireland. At an early stage they were disposed of their territory by the Mac Cana sept of the neighbouring Clan Cana (Clancann).
 A sept of the Uí Ceinnselaig, who were at one time chiefs of Uí Feilmeadha Thuaidh, located in present-day barony of Rathvilly in County Carlow, Republic of Ireland.

The similar name MacGarvey, which derives from the Mac Gairbhith sept located in present-day County Donegal, Republic of Ireland, is not usually anglicised as Garvey.

People
Adrian Garvey (born 1968), Zimbabwean-born South African rugby union player
Amy Ashwood Garvey (1897–1969), Jamaican Pan-Africanist activist, first wife of Marcus Garvey
Amy Jacques Garvey (1895–1973), Jamaican-American journalist; widow of Marcus Garvey
Anthony O'Garvey (1747–1766), Roman Catholic Bishop of Dromore
Art Garvey (1900–1973), professional American football player
Batty Garvey (1864–1932), English footballer
Brian Garvey (comics) (born 1961), comic book artist
Brian Garvey (footballer) (born 1937), English former footballer
Bruce Garvey (c. 1939–2010), British-born Canadian journalist and editor
Chuck Garvey, American rock band guitarist
Conor Garvey ( 2010s), Irish Gaelic footballer
Cyndy Garvey (born 1949), American television personality, first wife of baseball player Steve Garvey
Damien Garvey, Australian film and television actor
Dan Edward Garvey (1886–1974), American politician, governor of Arizona 1948–1951
Daniel Garvey, American educator and academic
Ed Garvey (1940-2017), American lawyer, activist, and politician
Edmund Garvey (1740–1813), Irish painter
Eugene A. Garvey (1845–1920), Irish American Roman Catholic priest, first Bishop of Altoona, Pennsylvania
Guy Garvey (born 1974), English rock singer and guitarist
James Garvey (footballer) (1878–after 1901), English footballer
James Garvey (Louisiana politician) (born 1964), American lawyer and politician 
James Garvey, American philosopher based in Britain
Jane Garvey, American administrator of the FAA 1997–2002
Jane Garvey (broadcaster) (born 1964), British radio presenter
John Garvey, several people
Kate Garvey, British public relations executive
Marcel Garvey (born 1983), English rugby union player
Marcus Garvey (1887–1940), Jamaican journalist, founder of the Back-to-Africa movement
Michael Garvey (born 1965), former Australian rules footballer
Mike Garvey (born 1962), American NASCAR driver
Philomena Garvey (1926–2009), Irish amateur golfer
Rea Garvey (born 1973), Irish singer-songwriter and guitarist
Robert Garvey (1908–1983), Jewish author
Sir Ronald Garvey (1903–1991), British colonial administrator
Steve Garvey (born 1948), American professional baseball player
Steve Garvey, (born 1958), British bass guitarist of the punk band Buzzcocks
Steve Garvey (footballer) (born 1973), English former professional footballer
Sir Terence Garvey (1915–1986), British diplomat, High Commissioner to India and Ambassador to the USSR
W. Timothy Garvey (born 1952), American professor of medicine

Fictional characters
Quinn Garvey, in the American TV series How I Met Your Mother.
The Garvey family, in the British TV series Benidorm. The family consists of Mick, Janice, Michael and Chantelle (Telle).
Preston Garvey, in the post apocalyptic video game Fallout 4 released in 2015.
Eugene Garvey, in the British TV series Waterloo Road (series 7).
Jonathan Garvey, in the TV show Little House on the Prairie played by Merlin Olsen.
The Garvey Family in the TV series The Leftovers: estranged wife, Laurie, children, Tom and Jill, and father, Kevin, played by Justin Theroux.

See also
Garvey School District, pre-K-8 school district serving the San Gabriel Valley in Southern California 
Garvey, a townland in Carnteel parish, County Tyrone, Northern Ireland
Garvey Avenue, San Gabriel Valley, California
Garvey Park, a multi-use stadium in Tavua, Fiji
Garvie, spelling variation
Garvin, spelling variation
Garvan, spelling variation

References

External links
The Irish Chiefs and Clans in Ulidia, or Down and Part of Antrim, Library Ireland

Surnames of Irish origin
Irish families
Irish royal families
Ulaid